An annular solar eclipse occurred on December 13–14, 1936. A solar eclipse occurs when the Moon passes between Earth and the Sun, thereby totally or partly obscuring the image of the Sun for a viewer on Earth. An annular solar eclipse occurs when the Moon's apparent diameter is smaller than the Sun's, blocking most of the Sun's light and causing the Sun to look like an annulus (ring). An annular eclipse appears as a partial eclipse over a region of the Earth thousands of kilometres wide. Annularity was visible from Australia, New Zealand on December 14 (Monday), and Oeno Island in Pitcairn Islands on December 13 (Sunday).

Related eclipses

Solar eclipses of 1935–1938

Saros 131

Inex series

Tritos series

Metonic series

Notes

References

1936 12 13
1936 in science
1936 12 13
December 1936 events